Rico Preißinger (born 21 July 1996) is a German professional footballer who plays as a midfielder for FC Ingolstadt 04 in 3. Liga.

Career statistics

References

External links
 
 
 

1996 births
Living people
People from Hof (district)
Sportspeople from Upper Franconia
Footballers from Bavaria
German footballers
Association football midfielders
1. FC Nürnberg II players
VfR Aalen players
1. FC Magdeburg players
FC Ingolstadt 04 players
2. Bundesliga players
3. Liga players
Regionalliga players